Adam Black (1784–1874) was a Scottish publisher and politician.

Adam Black may also refer to:

Adam Black (Australian politician) (1839–1902), Member of the Queensland Legislative Assembly
Adam Black (footballer, born 1898) (1898–1981), Scottish footballer who played for Leicester City
Adam Black (footballer, born 1992), English footballer who played for Accrington Stanley
Adam Black (rugby union) (born 1975), English rugby union player
Adam Black, character in Adam and Evelyne